A. Ronald Button (August 29, 1903 – January 31, 1987) was an American attorney and politician who served as California state treasurer from 1956 to 1959.

Early life and education 
Button was born in Plainview, Nebraska and graduated from Stanford University and Harvard Law School.

Career 
In 1928, he began to practice in Hollywood, where he had a number of celebrity clients, including Hedy Lamarr and Thelma Todd. He specialized in corporate and business law. During World War II, he was a major in the Army Signal Corps motion picture division, spending much of his duty time at Hal Roach Studios with actor Ronald Reagan.

Button was Republican State Central Committee chairman in 1953, when he was selected for the Republican National Committee in which he remained for three years. On November 1, 1956, California Governor Goodwin Knight appointed him state treasurer, succeeding Charles G. Johnson, who retired after 34 years in office amid a dispute with Knight and allegations of funneling state funds for personal use.

After he left state government in 1959, Button was a key developer of Rancho Mirage near Palm Springs.

Personal life 
In September 1931, he married actress Gladys McConnell, and they had a daughter, Mary Barbara Button (b. 9 February 1937, Los Angeles), now known as Barbara McAllister.

References

See also
Glenn E. Coolidge

1903 births
1987 deaths
Stanford University alumni
Harvard Law School alumni
State treasurers of California
California Republicans
20th-century American politicians